The term laurices refers to the fetus of the rabbit (Oryctolagus cuniculus) prepared without evisceration and consumed as a table delicacy.  The word is the plural of the Latin word laurex (variant laurix, n. masc., pl. laurices; English singular occasionally laurice), assumed to have been borrowed from an Iberian source.  The word is normally found in the plural number, since, due to their size, more than one would be served at a time.  The rabbit was adopted by the Romans  from Hispania, whence it spread over western Europe, as did likewise the custom of consuming laurices.

As the domestication of rabbits became established, the source of laurices was extended to newborns, because it became possible to harvest them without sacrificing the breeding doe, the time of birth being able to be monitored.

Earliest historical mention 
The first known mention of this gastronomic speciality is with Pliny the Elder (23—79) in his Naturalis Historia :

Gregory of Tours 
The consumption of laurices (called fetus cunicolorum) during the fast of Lent is mentioned by Gregory of Tours (ca. 538—594) in his Historia Francorum ("History of the Franks"), Book 5.4.

Earlier in the passage, Roccolen appears in conflict with Gregory of Tours himself, and Roccolen is described by Gregory as being an impious rascal. Therefore, Gregory's mention of this practice can best be interpreted as condemnation.

Myth 

The common theory that Pope Gregory I (540 – 604) authorized the consumption of laurices during Lent and other fasts, declaring them to be a marine species, like fish or shellfish, is false.
 The myth derives, in fact, from a misreading of Gregory of Tours' Historia Francorum 5.4 (quoted above) and a confusion between Gregory of Tours and Pope Gregory, two contemporary but different authors with the same name. Furthermore, this myth has also led to the idea that the rabbit was domesticated circa 600 AD, which must similarly be rejected.

Bibliography 
[BOS] Pliny the Elder. Bostock, John, Henry Thomas Riley eds. The Natural History, 2nd Ed., 1855.  Book VIII: "The Nature Of The Terrestrial Animals", Chapter 81(55): "The Different Species Of Hares."  Online version at Perseus.
[MAY] Pliny the Elder, Naturalis Historia (ed. Karl Friedrich Theodor Mayhoff.) Lipsiae [Leipzig]: Teubner. 1906.   Online version at Perseus.
[LEW Lewis, Charlton T. and Charles Short, A Latin Dictionary.  Oxford: Clarendon Press, 1879.  Online version at Perseus.
[ZEU] Zeuner, Frederick Everard.  A History of Domesticated Animals. New York: Harper & Row. 1963.

See also
Cuniculture

External links 
 [The Livestock Conservancy] The Livestock Conservancy: Rabbits  Classification by Pope Gregory the Great.  Site accessed 2007-02-08.
[CERB] Club des Eleveurs de Races Belges de Ronquières en Belgique.
[FAO] Lebas, F. et al. The Rabbit: Husbandry, Health and Production. Food and Agriculture Organization of the United Nations. Rome, 1986.

References 

Leporidae
Meat dishes
Rabbit dishes